The  113th Infantry Regiment is an Infantry regiment of the New Jersey Army National Guard. It is one of several National Guard units with colonial roots and campaign credit for the War of 1812.

Lineage
The unit's origins lie in the 1st New Jersey Regiment, Continental Army, created 26 October - 15 December 1775 to consist in part of existing militia companies from Essex County.
 Assigned 22 May 1777 to the New Jersey Brigade, an element of the Main Army
 Reorganized and redesignated 1 March 1783 as the New Jersey Regiment
 Furloughed 6 June 1783 at Newburgh, New York
 Disbanded 15 November 1783
Reorganized 5 June 1793 in the New Jersey Militia and expanded to form the Essex Brigade
(Elements of the Essex Brigade mustered into federal service during 1814)
 Essex Brigade reorganized 12 February 1852 and units from Newark and Elizabeth withdrawn to form the Independent Essex Brigade (remainder of Essex Brigade hereafter separate lineages)
 Independent Essex Brigade redesignated 2 February 1858 as the Newark Brigade
 1st Regiment, Newark Brigade, organized in 1858 at Newark
Mustered into federal service 30 April 1861 at Trenton as the 1st Regiment, New Jersey Brigade; mustered out of federal service 31 July 1861 at Newark
 Reorganized and mustered into federal service 14 September 1861 at Trenton as the 8th Regiment of Infantry, New Jersey Volunteers
 Reorganized and redesignated 21 September 1864 as the 8th Battalion, New Jersey Volunteers; consolidated 12 October 1864 with the 6th Battalion, New Jersey Volunteers (mustered into federal service 19 August 1861 at Trenton as the 6th Regiment of Infantry, New Jersey Volunteers), and consolidated unit reorganized and redesignated as the 8th Regiment of Infantry, New Jersey Volunteers
 Mustered out of federal service 17 July 1865 at Washington, D.C.
Former 1st Regiment, Newark Brigade, reorganized and redesignated 19 July 1865 as the 1st Regiment, New Jersey Rifle Corps
 (New Jersey Militia redesignated 9 March 1869 as the New Jersey National Guard)
 Reorganized 14 April 1869 in the New Jersey National Guard as the 1st Regiment
 Consolidated 22 June 1875 with the 2nd Regiment (see ANNEX 1) and consolidated unit designated as the 1st Regiment
 Consolidated 31 May 1892 with the 5th Regiment (Veteran) (see ANNEX 2) and consolidated unit designated as the 1st Regiment
 Mustered into federal service 5 ‑ 12 May 1898 at Sea Girt as the 1st New Jersey Volunteer Infantry; mustered out of federal service 4 November 1898 at Newark
 Reorganized 2 May 1899 in the New Jersey National Guard as the 1st Regiment with headquarters at Newark (1st Battalion, 2nd Regiment {see ANNEX 3}, concurrently reorganized and redesignated as Companies A, C, K, and M, 1st Regiment; companies withdrawn 4 February 1902 and reorganized as the 1st Battalion, 5th Regiment)
 Mustered into federal service 21 June 1916 at Sea Girt; mustered out of federal service 10 October 1916 at Newark
 Mustered into federal service 25 March 1917 at Newark; drafted into federal service 5 August 1917
 Consolidated 11 October 1917 with the 4th Regiment (see ANNEX 4), 2nd Regiment organized in 1899 through consolidation of the 3rd Regiment (organized in 1866 in the New Jersey Rifle Corps with headquarters at New Brunswick) and the 7th Regiment (organized in 1869 in the New Jersey National Guard as the 3rd Battalion with headquarters at Trenton; expanded, reorganized, and redesignated in 1872 as the 7th Regiment with headquarters at Lambertville) and consolidated unit reorganized and redesignated as the 113th Infantry and assigned to the 29th Division
 Demobilized 27‑28 May 1919 at Camp Dix, New Jersey
Former 1st and 4th Regiments consolidated with the 1st Battalion, 114th Infantry, and reorganized in the New Jersey National Guard as the 6th Infantry with headquarters federally recognized 13 November 1919 at Newark
 Redesignated 17 June 1921 as the 113th Infantry and assigned to the 44th Division
 Inducted into federal service 16 September 1940 at home stations
 Relieved 16 February 1942 at Fort Hancock, New Jersey from assignment to the 44th Division, reassigned to Eastern Defense Command 30 April 1942, relocated to Fort Hamilton, New York 19 March 1943
 Inactivated 25 September 1945 at Fort Rucker, Alabama
Consolidated 9 July 1946 with the 324th Infantry (see ANNEX 5) and consolidated unit designated as the 113th Infantry
 Regiment (less 2nd Battalion) reorganized and federally recognized 14 November 1946 at Newark as the 113th Armored Infantry Battalion and assigned to the 50th Armored Division; 2nd Battalion reorganized and federally recognized 3 December 1946 at Paterson as the 215th Armored Infantry Battalion and assigned to the 50th Armored Division (United States)
 113th and 215th Armored Infantry Battalions consolidated, reorganized, and redesignated 1 March 1959 as the 113th Infantry, a parent regiment under the Combat Arms Regimental System, to consist of the 1st and 2nd Armored Rifle Battalions, elements of the 50th Armored Division
 Reorganized 31 January 1963 to consist of the 1st and 2nd Battalions, elements of the 50th Armored Division
 Reorganized 1 July 1975 to consist of the 1st, 2nd, and 3rd Battalions, elements of the 50th Armored Division
 Reorganized 16 October 1984 to consist of the 2nd and 3rd Battalions, elements of the 50th Armored Division.
Withdrawn 1 May 1989 from the Combat Arms Regimental System and reorganized under the United States Army Regimental System
 Reorganized 1 September 1991 to consist of the 2nd Battalion, an element of the 50th Armored Division
 Reorganized 1 September 1993 to consist of the 2nd Battalion, an element of the 42nd Infantry Division. In 2012 the single remaining battalion of the regiment is assigned to the 50th Infantry Brigade Combat Team, NJ ARNG.
Redesignated 1 October 2005 as the 113th Infantry Regiment
Reorganized to consist of the 1st Battalion, an element of the 50th Infantry Brigade Combat Team

Annex 1
Mustered into federal service 27 May 1861 at Trenton as the 2d Regiment of Infantry, New Jersey Volunteers
Reorganized 17 December 1864 as the 2d Battalion, New Jersey Volunteers; mustered out of federal service 11 July 1865 at Hall's Hill, Virginia
Reorganized 19 July 1865 as the 2d Regiment, New Jersey Rifle Corps, with headquarters at Newark
Reorganized 14 April 1869 I the New Jersey National Guard as the 2d Regiment

Annex 2
Organized in 1866 in the New Jersey Militia at Newark as the 1st Battalion, Veterans
Expanded, reorganized and redesignated in 1867 as the Veteran Regiment
Reorganized 14 April 1869 in the New Jersey National Guard as the 5th Regiment (Veteran)

Annex 3
Organized 31 January 1880 as the Paterson Light Guard
Reorganized 25 May 1880 in the New Jersey National Guard as the 1st Battalion
Reorganized and redesignated 8 June 1892 as the 1st Battalion, 2d Regiment
Mustered into federal service 13–15 May 1898 at Sea Girt as the 1st Battalion, 2d New Jersey Volunteer Infantry; mustered out of federal service 17 November 1898 at Paterson
Reorganized 2 May 1899 in the New Jersey National Guard as Companies A, C, K, and M, 1st Regiment
Reorganized and redesignated 4 February 1902 as the 1st Battalion, 5th Regiment
Mustered into federal service 21–26 June at Sea Girt; mustered out of federal service 10–14 November 1916 at Paterson
Mustered into federal service 25 March 1917 at Paterson; drafted into federal service 5 August 1917
Reorganized and redesignated 11 October 1917 as the 1st Battalion, 114th Infantry, an element of the 29th Division
Demobilized 14 May 1919 at Camp Dix, New Jersey

Annex 4
Organized from exiting units in the Hudson Brigade, New Jersey Militia and mustered into federal service 1 May 1861 at Trenton as the 2d Regiment, New Jersey Brigade; mustered out of federal service 31 July 1861 at Trenton and reorganized in the New Jersey Militia as the 2d Regiment, Hudson Brigade
Reorganized 14 April 1869 in the New Jersey National Guard as the 1st Battalion with headquarters at Hoboken
Expanded, reorganized, and redesignated 6 April 1874 as the 9th Regiment with headquarters at Hoboken
Redesignated 27 March 1886 as the 2d Regiment
Consolidated 31 May 1892 with the 4th Regiment (organized in 1867 in the New Jersey Rifle Corps as the 4th Regiment with headquarters at Hudson City; reorganized 14 April 1869 in the New Jersey National Guard as the 4th Regiment with headquarters at Jersey City)
Mustered into federal service 7–24 July 1898 at Sea Girt as the 4th New Jersey Volunteer Infantry; mustered out of federal service 6 April 1899 at Greenville, South Carolina
Reorganized 2 May 1899 in the New Jersey National Guard as the 4th Regiment with headquarters at Jersey City
Mustered into federal service 21 June 1916 at Sea Girt; mustered out of federal service 13 October 1916 at Sea Girt
Mustered into federal service 12 April 1917 at Jersey City; drafted into federal service 5 October 1917

Annex 5
Constituted 5 August 1917 in the National Army as the 324th Infantry and assigned to the 81st Division
Organized in September 1917 at Camp Jackson, South Carolina
Demobilized 17 June 1919 at Camp Devens, Massachusetts
Reconstituted 24 June 1921 in the Organized Reserves as the 324th Infantry and assigned to the 81st Division
Organized in January 1922 with headquarters at Memphis, Tennessee
Inactivated 30 January 1942 and relieved from assignment to the 81st Division
Withdrawn 1 February 1943 from the Organized Reserves, allotted to the Army of the United States, and activated at Fort Lewis, Washington, as an element of the 44th Infantry Division

Commanders

2021 - Present LTC Brian Gregg
2019 - 2021 LTC Nicholas Calenicoff
2017 – 2019 LTC Richard T. Karcher
2014 – 2017 LTC Walter R. Gill
2012 – 2014 LTC Douglas J. Brockmann
2010 – 2012 COL Paul Nema
2008 – 2010 BG Mark A. Piterski
2007 – 2008 LTC James A. Hayes
2005 – 2007 COL Nicholas Chimienti
2004 – 2005 LTC Patrick M. Dacey
2002 – 2004 LTC Joseph M. O'Connor
2000 – 2002 LTC Kenneth R. Rausa
1998 – 2000 COL Peter F. Falco
1994 – 1996 COL Richard W. Kuechenmeister
1990 – 1994 COL Leonard Luzky
1988 – 1990 LTC John Promaulayko
1986 – 1988 COL Warren J. Curd
1943 – 1943 LTC Vinton L. James
1942 – 1943 COL Gilbert B. Brownwell
1941 – 1942 MG Norman H. Schwarkoff
1940 – 1941 MG Manton S. Eddy
1918 – 1918 COL John E. Woodward
1917 – 1917 COL John D. Fraser
1898 – 1898 COL Robert G. Smith
1864 – 1865 COL John Ramsay
1863 – 1864 MAJ John G. Langston
1862 – 1863 COL John Ramsay
1861 – 1862 COL Adolphus J. Johnson
Note: Highest Rank Attained by Commander Listed

Command Sergeant Major

2021–Present CSM Lisandro Peralta
2017 – 2021 CSM Kevin Kirkpatrick
2015 – 2017 CSM Leonel Abreu
2011 – 2014 CSM Thomas E. Alexander
2006 – 2011 CSM Thomas J. Clark
2005 – 2006 CSM Ricardo Reyes
2004 – 2005 CSM Joseph V. Tatem
1995 – 2004 CSM Jerome Jenkins
1992 – 1995 CSM Robert Trainor
1989 – 1992 CSM Donald Feldhan

Campaign Participation

Revolutionary War

Brandywine 1777
Germantown 1777
Monmouth 1778
Canada 1776
New York 1776
New Jersey 1777
New York 1777
New York 1779
New Jersey 1780
Yorktown 1781

War of 1812
Streamer Without inscription

Civil War
Bull Run
Peninsula

Manassas
Antietam
Fredericksburg

Chancellorsville

Gettysburg

Wilderness
Spotsylvania
Cold Harbor

Petersburg

Shenandoah
Appomattox

Virginia 1863

World War I
Meuse-Argonne

Alsace 1918
Lorraine 1918

World War II
Northern France

The Rhineland

Ardennes-Alsace

Central Europe

Company A (Essex Troop-Newark), Company B (Newark), and Company D (Jersey City), 2nd Battalion, each additionally entitled to: World War II-EAMEC and Normandy (with arrowhead)

Company C (Woodbridge), 2d Battalion, additionally entitled to: World War II-AP and Aleutian Islands

War on Terrorism
Phase 5: Iraqi Surge

Phase 6: Iraqi Sovereignty

HHC, 2D BATTALION,113TH INFANTRY REGIMENT(Riverdale), Company A (Newark), Company B (Jersey City), Company C (Woodbridge), Company F 250th BSB (Teaneck), **attached**  Troop A,(Dover) 1st Squadron, 102d Cavalry Regiment

 The Iraq Campaign Streamer is added to the 2/113 Infantry Battalion's Guidon on 22 January.

Decorations
War on Terrorism

HHC, 2D BATTALION,113TH INFANTRY REGIMENT(Riverdale), and Troop A,(Dover) 1st Squadron, 102d Cavalry Regiment each entitled to Meritorious Unit Commendation (MUC) Iraq Service.
(GENERAL ORDERS NO. 2014–12 28 May 2014)

World War II
Company A (Essex Troop-Newark), 2nd Battalion, entitled to: French Croix de Guerre with Palm and World War II and Streamer embroidered BEACHES OF NORMANDY
Belgium Fourrangere 1940
Cited in the Order of the Day of the Belgian Army for action in Belgium
Cited in the Order of the Day of the Belgian Army for action in the Ardennes
Company B (Newark) and Company D (Jersey City), 2nd Battalion, each entitled to: French Croix de Guerre with Palm and World War II and Streamer embroidered BEACHES OF NORMANDY

Distinctive unit insignia
 Description
A Gold color metal and enamel device 1 1/8 inches (2.86 cm) in height overall consisting of a shield blazoned:  Azure, a saltire Argent, in chief an oak tree eradicated of the last.  Attached above the shield from a wreath Argent and Azure, a lion's head erased Or collared four fusils Gules.  Attached below and to the sides of the shield a Gold scroll inscribed "FIDELIS ET FORTIS" in Black letters.
 Symbolism
The shield is blue for the Infantry; the white saltire cross commemorates the service of the old regiment in the Civil War and the silver oak tree the service in World War I (Argonne Forest).  The motto is the motto of the old 1st New Jersey Infantry and translates to "Faithful and Brave."
 Background
The distinctive unit insignia was originally approved for the 113th Infantry Regiment on 26 March 1925.  It was amended to include the motto on 22 July 1925.  It was redesignated for the 113th Armored Infantry Battalion on 5 July 1952.  The insignia was redesignated for the 113th Infantry Regiment and amended to include the State crest on 5 June 1961.

Coat of arms

Blazon
 Shield
Azure, a saltire Argent, in chief an oak tree eradicated of the last.  Attached above the shield from a wreath Argent and Azure, a lion's head erased Or collared four fusils Gules.
 Crest
That for the regiments and separate battalions of the New Jersey Army National Guard:  On a wreath of the colors Argent and Azure, a lion's head erased Or collared four fusils Gules. Motto:   FIDELIS ET FORTIS (Faithful and Brave).

Symbolism
 Shield
The shield is blue for the Infantry; the white saltire cross commemorates the service of the old regiment in the Civil War and the silver oak tree the service in World War I (Argonne Forest).
 Crest
The crest is that of the New Jersey Army National Guard.

Background
The coat of arms was originally approved for the 113th Infantry Regiment on 26 March 1925.  It was redesignated for the 113th Armored Infantry Battalion on 5 July 1952.  It was redesignated for the 113th Infantry Regiment on 5 June 1961.

References

 
 
http://www.apd.army.mil/Search/ePubsSearch/ePubsSearchDownloadPage.aspx?docID=0902c851800106ec
 Historical register and dictionary of the United States Army, from ..., Volume 1 By Francis Bernard Heitman 
 Encyclopedia of United States Army insignia and uniforms By William K. Emerson (page 51).

External links
 The Institute of Heraldry, 113TH INFANTRY REGIMENT 
 New Jersey National Guard 
 National Guard Militia Museum of New Jersey 
 United States Army Lineage And Honors Information 
 8th New Jersey Infantry Regiment Engagements 
 8th New Jersey Infantry Regiment Monument - Gettysburg .  Location 
 8th New Jersey Infantry Regiment - Participation at Gettysburg (Oral Description of Battle) .
 8th New Jersey Volunteer Infantry - Unit History 
 Richard A. Rinaldi, The US Army in World War I - Orders of Battle 
 https://web.archive.org/web/20110105180532/http://oldnewark.com/military/units/index.htm
 http://www.globalsecurity.org/military/agency/army/2-113in.htm
 http://www.dvidshub.net/video/56925/troops-help-secure-area-around-camp-bucca#.VI39Aa0tGP8 2-113th Infantry Troops Help Secure Area Around Camp Bucca
 Army Regulation 600-8-22  
 113th Facebook BN 
 44th IBCT Facebook 
 113th Infantry BN Website  

113
113
Military units and formations established in 1775
1775 establishments in New Jersey
New Jersey National Guard